In fluid dynamics, the Coriolis–Stokes force is a forcing of the mean flow in a rotating fluid due to interaction of the Coriolis effect and wave-induced Stokes drift. This force acts on water independently of the wind stress.

This force is named after Gaspard-Gustave Coriolis and George Gabriel Stokes, two nineteenth-century scientists.

The Coriolis–Stokes forcing on the mean circulation in an Eulerian reference frame was first given by :

See also
Ekman layer
Ekman transport

Notes

References

 
 
 
 

Fluid dynamics
Water waves